Following is a list of senators of Hautes-Alpes, people who have represented the department of Hautes-Alpes in the Senate of France.

Third Republic

Senators for Hautes-Alpes under the French Third Republic were:

Fourth Republic

Senators for Hautes-Alpes under the French Fourth Republic were:

Fifth Republic 
Senators for Hautes-Alpes under the French Fifth Republic:

References

Sources

 
Lists of members of the Senate (France) by department

Senators of the Hautes-Alpes department of France.

People from Hautes-Alpes